Aisyah Putri The Series: Jilbab In Love is an Indonesian soap opera musical comedy drama produced by SinemArt that airs daily on RCTI. The cast includes Anna Gilbert, Miller Khan, Aliff Alli, Henindar Amroe, and Lucky Perdana. The story is a loose adaptation of the book Asma Nadia.

Synopsis 
The show's central character is a high school student named Aisyah Putri (Anna Gilbert).

Cast
 Anna Gilbert as Aisyah Putri and Puput (dual role)
 Miller Khan as Vincent
 Meyda Sefira as Arum
 Lucky Perdana as Hamka
 Aliff Alli as Iid
 Farish Nahdi as Harap
 Rosiana Dewi as Icha
 Syifa Hadju as Ana
 Jauhar as Izam
 Bella Graceva as Rasty
 Umar Lubis as Ridwan
 Rico Tampatty as Piet
 Henidar Amroe as aunt Aira
 Salshabilla Adriani as Bianca
 Steffi Zamora as Dara
 Cassandra Lee as Elisha
 Kevin Torsten as Ramos
 Meinorizah as Linda
 Faturahman as Pinoy
 Yoelitta Palar as Marini
 Rasyid Karim as Sugeng
 Bryan Domani as Bryan
 Verrell Bramasta as Verrell
 Zahwa Aqilah as Cindy
 Jansen Widjaya as Nugros
 Krisna Murti Wibowo as Anton
 Julian Jacob as Julian Jacob
 Eno TB as Bu Roro
 Johan Morgan as father Anna

Music 
The music is by Fatin Shidqia, from her album Single Realigi 2014 (Sony Music Indonesia). She also sings the opening and closing theme, "Proud Of You Moslem".

Controversy
In the first episode aired on October 27, 2014, this soap opera showed a scene of teenage boys in school uniforms kissing Icha. The Komisi Penyiaran Indonesia (KPI, Indonesian Broadcasting Commission), decided that the program violated the Broadcasting Code of Conduct and Broadcasting Program Standard, and imposed administrative sanctions by a written warning.

References

External links 
  Synopsis Aisyah Putri The Series: Jilbab In Love at Website Rcti.tv
  Synopsis Aisyah Putri The Series: Jilbab In Love at Website SinemArt

2014 Indonesian television series debuts
Indonesian drama television series
Indonesian television soap operas
2010s high school television series
Musical television soap operas
2010s Indonesian television series
2010s television soap operas
Television series about teenagers